Thaskaraveeran may refer to:

Thaskaraveeran (1957 film), Malayalam film starring Sathyan and Ragini
Thaskaraveeran (2005 film), Malayalam film starring Mammootty and Nayantara